Bawa Kassim Valiyullah Masjith, is a mosque in the Kanyakumari district of Tamil Nadu, India. The name was derived from Bawa Kasssim Valiyullah who migrated from Saudi Arabia to Kanyakumari district in India in 16th century AD.

Mosques in Tamil Nadu
Buildings and structures in Kanyakumari district